The 1973 NCAA College Division football rankings are from the United Press International poll of College Division head coaches and from the Associated Press poll of sportswriters and broadcasters. The 1973 NCAA Division II football season was the 16th year UPI published a Coaches Poll and it was the 14th year for the Associated Press. Both polls used the term "College Division" in 1973, but many of the referenced publications continued to use the "Small College" terminology.

Instead of using the polls to crown a national champion, 1973 was the first year for the Division II playoffs. The final UPI poll was released before the playoffs, and the final AP poll was released after the playoffs.

Legend

The AP poll

The UPI Coaches poll

Notes

References

Rankings
NCAA College Division football rankings